Dimethoxycoumarin may refer to:

 Citropten (5,7-dimethoxycoumarin)
 Scoparone (6,7-dimethoxycoumarin)